Hossein Charkhabi (born September 23, 1950) is an Iranian football coach.

References 

1950 births
Living people
Iranian footballers
Sepahan S.C. managers
Iranian football managers
Zob Ahan Esfahan F.C. managers
Sportspeople from Isfahan
Association footballers not categorized by position